"That's Why God Made the Radio" is a song written by Joe Thomas, Brian Wilson, Jim Peterik, and Larry Millas for the American rock band The Beach Boys. It was the first new single from the band in 20 years and was included on the band's 29th studio album of the same name. The album was recorded to coincide with the band's 50th anniversary, which featured a reunion tour of the surviving co-founders. According to the song's co-writer Peterik:

Commercial performance
"That's Why God Made the Radio" made its national radio debut April 25, 2012 on ESPN's Mike and Mike in the Morning. It was released to the band's YouTube channel later that same day, with accompanying lyrics. In addition, the song has been released and is now available as a single in digital outlets such as iTunes and Amazon.

Reception
Rolling Stone named the song the 30th best song of 2012.

Chart positions

References

The Beach Boys songs
2012 singles
2012 songs
Capitol Records singles
Song recordings produced by Brian Wilson
Songs written by Brian Wilson
Songs about radio